Oscar Glenn (August 27, 1913 – March 13, 1977), nicknamed "Hap", was an American Negro league third baseman in the 1930s.

A native of Stone Mountain, Georgia, Glenn played for the Atlanta Black Crackers in 1937 and 1938. He died in Warren, Ohio in 1977 at age 63.

References

External links
 and Baseball-Reference Black Baseball stats and Seamheads

1913 births
1977 deaths
Atlanta Black Crackers players
20th-century African-American sportspeople
Baseball infielders